The 1971 Campeonato Ecuatoriano de Fútbol Serie A, the first division of Ecuadorian football (soccer), was played by 16 teams. The champion was Barcelona.

First stage

Liguilla del No Descenso

Liguilla Final

External links
 Ecuador 1971 

1971
Ecu
Football